Qatayef or katayef or qata'if, is an Arab dessert commonly served during the month of Ramadan, a sort of sweet dumpling filled with cream or nuts. It can be described as a folded pancake, similar to a Scottish crumpet.

Etymology
The Arabic word qaṭaːyif is derived from the Arabic root q-ṭ-f, meaning to pick up or to pluck.

Origin
Qatayef is believed to be of Fatimid origin. Some believe that qatayef are the creation of the Fatimid Dynasty, however, their history dates back to the Abbasid Caliphate, 750-1258 CE. Qatayef was mentioned in a tenth century Arabic cookbook dates back to the Abbasid Caliphate by Ibn Sayyar al-Warraq called Kitab al-Ṭabīḫ (The Book of Dishes). The book was later translated by Nawal Nasrallah under the name Annals of the Caliphs' Kitchens. The traditional stuffing of Qatayef as evident in a number of Medieval Arabic cookbooks is crushed almond and sugar, once the pancake was stuffed, it would sometimes be fried in walnut oil or baked in the oven. Qatayef was traditionally prepared by street vendors as well as households in Egypt and the Levant. It is usually filled with akkawi cheese, crushed walnuts, as well as crushed pistachios. Diverse fillings, such as Nutella, are also used.

Preparation
Qatayef is the general name of the dessert as a whole and, more specifically, the batter. 
It is usually made out of flour, baking powder, water, yeast, and sometimes sugar. The result of the batter being poured onto a round hot plate appears similar to pancakes, except only one side is cooked, then stuffed and folded. The pastry is filled with either unsalted sweet cheese a mixture of any of hazelnuts, walnuts, almonds, pistachios, raisins, powdered sugar, vanilla extract, rose extract (ma-zahr ماء الزهر), and cinnamon. It is then deep fried or, less commonly, baked and served with a hot sweet syrup or sometimes honey. Another way of serving qatayef is by filling it with whipped cream or qishta (قشطة), folding it halfway, and serving it with scented syrup without frying or baking. This way of serving is called assafiri qatayef (قطايف عصافيري).

Customs

Qatayef is a popular dessert that is usually prepared during Ramadan.

See also
 List of Middle Eastern dishes
Mandugwa, a similar Korean dessert
Knafeh

References

Arab desserts
Dumplings
Egyptian cuisine
Iraqi cuisine
Jordanian cuisine
Levantine cuisine
Lebanese cuisine
Palestinian cuisine
Syrian cuisine
Stuffed desserts
Iftar foods
Deep fried foods
Middle Eastern cuisine